The 1963–64 season was the 65th season for FC Barcelona.

Results

External links

webdelcule.com

FC Barcelona seasons
Barcelona